Journey Out of Darkness is a 1967 Australian film.

Plot
In 1901, trooper Peterson is sent to the Australian Outback to arrest an aboriginal man responsible for a ritual killing. He is accompanied by blacktracker Jubbal.

On the way back Jubbal is killed, and Peterson and the prisoner form a relationship.

Cast
Konrad Matthaei as Peterson
Ed Devereaux as Jubbal
Kamahl as prisoner
Ron Morse as Sergeant Miller
Marie Clark as Mrs Miller
Betty Campbell as Jubbal's wife
John Campbell as first child
Don Campbell as second child
Julie Williams as aboriginal girl
Nukitjilpi as chief
Roy Dadaynga as tribesman
the Arnhem Land Dancers from the Yirrkala Mission

Production
Director James Trainor had worked at the Commonwealth Film Unit and worked in the United States as a documentary director. He wrote the script with his father-in-law, noted Hollywood screenwriter Howard E. Koch. Konrad Matthaei agreed to help finance the film if he was allowed to play the lead role.

Kamahl a popular singer from Sri Lanka who had emigrated to Australia was cast in a lead role.

White actor Ed Devereaux was cast as an Aboriginal. "If the producers had had the time they undoubtedly would have cast about for an Aboriginal actor," said Devereaux. "But they had to have a man with experience, for there could be no delay - we shot this film fast and furious."
 
Filming began in January 1967 and took place in outback Australia and at the studios of Supreme Sound. Location filming took six weeks.

Release
The film had its world premiere in Canberra at a screening that was attended by the Governor General Lord Casey and the Prime Minister Harold Holt (it was one of the last functions attended by Holt prior to his drowning). However its commercial response was disappointing.

Filmink magazine later wrote "It has its heart in the right place, albeit in a ‘50s Hollywood liberal way...but is fatally compromised by the casting of Sri Lankan Kamahl and white Ed Devereaux in blackface as aboriginals, not to mention Konrad Matthaei being simply dull in the lead. The film’s main problem is structural – there is no urgency in the trip and nothing interesting happens on the way. Once you stop laughing at Devereaux, it’s just boring."

See also
List of American films of 1967

References

External links
Journey Out of Darkness at Creative Spirits
Journey Out of Darkness at Australian Screen Online

Journey Out of Darkness at Oz Movies
Journey Out of Darkness at National Film and Sound Archive

1967 films
1960s adventure drama films
Films set in Australia
Films shot in Australia
Films set in 1901
1967 drama films
1960s English-language films